Hartstene Bay is a small bay on the north-west coast of Greenland. It is part of the Avannaata municipality.

Cape Alexander is located at the western end of this bay.

References

Bays of Greenland